Michael Reiter may refer to:
Michael Reiter (computer scientist), professor at University of North Carolina
Michael Reiter (police officer), security advisor and former chief of police of Palm Beach, Florida